Como House is a historical house, with associated gardens in the City of Stonnington, Victoria, Australia. It was constructed in 1847 for Sir Edward Eyre Williams, and now serves as a tourist attraction under the custodianship of the National Trust of Australia. The gardens are open Monday to Saturday from 9am to 5pm and Sunday from 10am to 5pm. The historic house is open for guided tours every Saturday and Sunday.

Location
The house and landscaped area is located in the suburb of South Yarra, Victoria, adjacent to Como Park.

History
The first sale of land by the Crown in the area took place on 10 June 1840 when land bounded by Kooyong Road, Gardiners Creek (Yarra River). Gardiners Creek Road (now Toorak Road) and Glenferrie Road was sold. The purchasers included Jane Hill (the widow of pastoralist David Hill), the Langhorne Bros. (the nephews of Captain William Lonsdale), Capt. John Browne and James Jackson. 

Como House was constructed in 1847 and owned by Sir Edward Eyre Williams, a supreme court justice, until 1852 when it was sold to investor Frederick Dalgety. After only a year, it was sold to John Brown - a master builder and wine and spirit merchant - who took possession in 1853 and commenced a program of works to transform the property including adding a second storey (which included a ballroom) to the house. 

In December 1855 William Sangster was appointed head gardener and overseer at Como.  At that time the 53-acre site comprised partly cleared land, a rocky hill and a swamp adjoining the river. The site was bounded to the north by Gardener’s Creek Rd (now Toorak Rd) down to the Yarra River and extended west from Williams Rd to the vicinity of Kensington Rd.  Sangster designed and laid out the five-acre formal pleasure gardens section of the grounds with exotic trees to create an ideal “picturesque garden” with borrowed views across the river.  The design featured an impressive carriage drive from the main road. Large areas were set aside for the growing of almond trees, vegetables and fruit. In 1864 Brown's insolvency forced a mortgage to the Bank of Australasia. When Brown’s bank sold to the Armytages in 1864 Sangster remained until mid-1866. 

Charles Armytage purchased the property for £14,000 in 1864. The family stayed for 95 years, eventually selling the property to the newly formed National Trust of Australia in 1959.

The Seekers filmed the video for their version of Morningtown Ride at Como House.

Improvements to the property continued in the 1980s.

Further reading

References

External links
  National Trust of Australia (Victoria) site - Como House and Garden

National Trust of Australia
Historic house museums in Victoria (Australia)
Houses in Melbourne
Landmarks in Melbourne
Buildings and structures in the City of Stonnington
Heritage-listed buildings in Melbourne